Isabelle Dethan (born 28 December 1967) is a French comic book artist.

Her first comic was published in the German magazine . In 1992, Dethan received the  prize at the Angoulême International Comics Festival. In 1993, she began her trilogy . She is a contributor to the magazine . Dethan has also created a graphic novel based on Alice's Adventures in Wonderland.

Selected work 
 , series (1997-)
  (2000)
 , series (2001-)
 , series (2001-)
 , series (2006-), with 
 Le Tombeau d'Alexandre, series (2008-) with 
 , series (2011-)

References 

1967 births
Living people
French comics artists
People from Bègles